The Bibliotheca Hagiographica Graeca is a catalogue of Greek hagiographic materials, including ancient literary works on the saints' lives, the translations of their relics, and their miracles, arranged alphabetically by saint.  It is usually abbreviated as BHG in scholarly literature.  The listings include MSS, incipits, and printed editions.  The first two editions (1895, 1909) were edited by the Bollandists, which included the Jesuit scholar Hippolyte Delehaye.  The most recent editions have been the product of a single editor François Halkin.  The BHG along with the Bibliotheca Hagiographica Latina and Bibliotheca Hagiographica Orientalis are the most useful tools in the research of literary documents concerning the saints.

Editions
 Bibliotheca hagiographica graeca; seu, Elenchus vitarum sanctorum, ed. Société des Bollandistes (Bruxelles: Apud editories, 1895).
 Bibliotheca hagiographica graeca, 2nd ed., ed. Société des Bollandistes, Subsidia Hagiographica 8 (Bruxelles: Société des Bollandistes, 1909).
 Bibliotheca hagiographica graeca, 3rd ed., 3 vols., ed. François Halkin, Subsidia Hagiographica 8a (Bruxelles: Société des Bollandistes, 1957 [reprinted 1986]).
 Bibliotheca hagiographica graeca. Auctarium, ed. François Halkin, Subsidia Hagiographica 47 (Brussels: Société des Bollandistes, 1969).
 Bibliotheca hagiographica graeca. Novum Auctarium, ed. François Halkin, Subsidia Hagiographica 65 (Bruxelles: Société des Bollandistes, 1984).

See also 
Bibliotheca Hagiographica Latina
Bibliotheca Hagiographica Orientalis

References

External links
 Online database search of Bibliotheca Hagiographica Graeca 
 Society of Bollandists
 Open Library.
 Clavis Clavium, a database containing all BHG records

Christian hagiography
Catalogues
Jesuit publications
Greek-language books
Belgian books
20th-century non-fiction books
20th-century history books